Charitina of Lithuania (died 1281) is a saint in the Eastern Orthodox Church. Her feast is on 5 October. Because her hagiography did not survive, very little is known about her life.

Charitina was a noblewoman from the pagan Grand Duchy of Lithuania who became a nun in Novgorod. Possibly she was arranged to marry a Prince of Novgorod, but that could be a conflation of Charitina with  who was betrothed to Fyodor, eldest son of Yaroslav II of Vladimir. In Novgorod, unmarried Charitina entered the Monastery of Saints Peter and Paul. There she earned the reputation of piousness and became an abbess. In 2009, Lithuanian historian Algimantas Bučys raised a hypothesis that she might be a daughter of Tautvilas, who escaped to Novgorod after her father's murder by Treniota.

References 

1281 deaths
Lithuanian saints
Eastern Orthodox saints
13th-century Christian saints
Year of birth unknown
Christian female saints of the Middle Ages
13th-century Lithuanian people
13th-century Lithuanian women